The Jhyamta (Nepali: झ्याम्टा) (phonetic: Jhyāmṭā) is a Nepali traditional musical instrument played by artist of Nepal. It looks similar to cymbal. Kirat community uses this with dhol (kirat)) in various cultural festivals such as Sakela, Chyabrung, Udhauli, Ubhauli and other social functions.

This is also known as the Taal.

Cymbals of Nepal
Idiophones